CNN/Sports Illustrated (CNN/SI) was a 24-hour sports news network. It was created by Time Warner, merging together its CNN and Sports Illustrated brands and related resources. It was launched on December 12, 1996.

Other news networks like ESPNews, provided 30-minute blocks of news and highlights in a similar fashion to CNN Headline News at the time, but CNN/SI was live daily from 7am to 2am. Their purpose was to provide the most comprehensive sports news service on television, bringing in-depth sports news from around the world, and integrating the Internet and television.

Closure
CNN/SI's closure had been attributed to competition with other all-sports news networks which started around the same time, such as ESPNews and Fox Sports Net's National Sports Report. Though CNN/SI aired exclusive content, such as the tape of Indiana University player Neil Reed appearing to be choked by former coach Bob Knight, the channel reached only 20 million homes, not adequate enough to receive a rating by Nielsen Media Research, which reduced sponsorship. ESPNews, in contrast, benefited from being bundled with ESPN (86.5 million homes). The news channel parent CNN did not have the same influence with cable operators for its all-sports news channel. CNN's cancellation of their flagship sports program, Sports Tonight (which had already been retooled to compete with SportsCenter) after the September 11 attacks contributed to the closure of CNN/SI, as it lost all connections to their mother network.

Near its closure, Sports Tonight was exclusive to CNN/SI. CNN/SI added NASCAR qualifying, Wimbledon matches, National Lacrosse League matches, and televised the now-defunct Women's United Soccer Association

CNN/SI shut down on May 15, 2002. On many cable systems, CNN/SI was replaced by NBA TV. NBA TV, which launched in 1999, eventually evolved into a joint venture between Time Warner and the NBA that officially launched on October 28, 2008.

While the network closed, its international sports program World Sport continues airing and since 2002 has been produced by CNN International.

Website 

The CNN/SI name was maintained for Sports Illustrateds online presence, which was located at cnnsi.com. In January 2013, CNN acquired Bleacher Report and after Time Warner's spin-off of their publishing assets into Time Inc. (and subsequently sale to Meredith Corporation and later, to IAC's Dotdash), they dropped all use of the Sports Illustrated name.

Programming

Sports Tonight (1996–2001) hosted by various anchors
NFL Preview hosted by Bob Lorenz with analysts Trev Alberts, Irving Fryar and Peter King
College Football Preview hosted by Bob Lorenz with analyst Trev Alberts and Ivan Maisel
This Week in the NBA hosted by Andre Aldridge and Kevin Loughery
Sports Illustrated Golf Plus hosted by Bob Fiscella and Phil Jones
World Sport hosted by various anchors
Page One hosted by Laura Okmin
NASCAR Plus hosted by Johnny Phelps
Sports Illustrated - Cover to Cover
Trev Alberts' Full Tilt
The Sporting Life with Jim Huber

References

External links 
 Sports Illustrated Homepage
 CNNSi.com Domain Name Sells for $5,500

CNN
Sports television networks in the United States
English-language television stations in the United States
Television channels and stations established in 1996
Defunct television networks in the United States
Turner Sports
Television channels and stations disestablished in 2002